Career Girls is a 1997 British comedy-drama film written and directed by Mike Leigh which tells the story of two women, who reunite after six years apart. The film stars Katrin Cartlidge and Lynda Steadman. The women were originally thrown together when they shared a flat while at university and the film focuses on their interpersonal relationship.

Plot
In 1996, Annie is on the train to London to spend the weekend with Hannah, her flatmate when at polytechnic (the Polytechnic of North London) six years earlier. Hannah laments about her alcoholic mother, and Annie talks about her mother's search for a new boyfriend. Annie, who still lives with her mother, admires Hannah's independence. In contrast, Hannah laments being forced to be independent since she was a child.

Back in 1986, Hannah and Claire interview and accept Annie into their flat. Annie and Hannah discuss getting rid of Claire the next year. Hannah and Annie discuss how Hannah hasn't cried since she was eight, when her parents split up. Annie, whose parents also divorced when she was eight, says she cries all the time. The following year, Ricky Burton, a socially awkward stutterer, has temporarily moved in with Hannah and Annie after being kicked out by his landlord. While discussing psychological traits with them in a pub, Ricky's untactful probing angers Hannah. While Ricky visits the Chinese takeaway beneath the flat, Annie and Hannah discuss the argument and how Ricky fancies Annie. In another memory, Ricky drunkenly confesses his love for Annie, but Annie says she's in love with someone else. Ricky leaves and doesn't reappear, so Hannah and Annie travel to his grandmother's home in Hartlepool. She tells them that Ricky has gone out, possibly along the seafront, so they go to look for him there.

In the present, Annie accompanies Hannah as she looks for a flat to buy. One flat is owned by a Mr Evans, whose flat contains a painting of his naked ex-girlfriend and pornographic magazines. Evans hits on Hannah and offers both women alcoholic drinks. They run out of the flat making excuses, and are still laughing as they drive off. At the next flat, Adrian Spinks, an estate agent, meets them. Annie realises he is an old college boyfriend, but Adrian says he doesn't recognise them. In between their conversations, flashbacks show Hannah and Annie's history with Adrian. After meeting him at a club, Hannah takes Adrian home and sleeps with him. The following morning, he walks into Annie's room and tries to chat her up. In other flashbacks, Annie tells Adrian about a recurring sexual fantasy. Later, they kiss and discuss why he split up with his ex-girlfriend: Adrian says he didn't want the commitment, and leaves when Annie asks why.

In the present, Hannah and Annie learn that Adrian is married with a child. At a Chinese restaurant, Annie and Hannah discuss how they have changed since university and wonder what happened to Ricky. Annie says she hadn't stopped thinking about Adrian for ten years. Hannah says she was hurt by the situation back then but said she didn't say anything because she knew that Annie was in love with him. In a flashback, Annie and Hannah cry and hug as they pack, preparing to leave their flat at the end of their four years at university.

At the present-day dinner, Hannah recalls being overwhelmed upon meeting Annie's kind family, as opposed to her own dysfunctional family. They see their old flatmate Claire jogging on Primrose Hill, and discuss the coincidence of seeing two old acquaintances in one afternoon. They decide to visit their old flat, and there spot Ricky sitting on the steps outside the Chinese takeaway, holding a toy elephant. He seems angry and delirious, and tells them he arrived from Hartlepool the previous day. He says the toy is for his son, but the mother won't admit that the child is his. He tells them that his grandmother died, and, when Annie asks where he lives, responds that they don't care. They leave.

In a flashback to their visit to Hartlepool, they find Ricky by the sea. His health, both mental and physical, has deteriorated. He is babbling and no longer the charming witty stutterer. Hannah and Annie ask how he is. He shouts and swears at them that he doesn't care. They chase after him. He is verbally abusive. He screams at them to leave him alone. Later, both Hannah and Annie are moved to tears at his pitiful condition.

In the present, they return to the railway station, where they say goodbye to one another.

Cast
 Katrin Cartlidge as Hannah Mills
 Lynda Steadman as Annie
 Kate Byers as Claire
 Joe Tucker as Adrian Spinks
 Mark Benton as Ricky Burton
 Andy Serkis as Mr. Evans

Reception
Career Girls has an 88% approval rating on Rotten Tomatoes, based on 24 reviews, with an average rating of 7.2/10. The website's critics consensus reads: "Outwardly modest but carried along by Mike Leigh's deft direction, Career Girls gradually accumulates power as a study of shared history." According to Metacritic, which sampled 25 critics and calculated a weighted average score of 76 out of 100, the film received "generally favorable reviews".

Awards and nominations

European Film Awards
Nominated: Best Actress – Leading Role (Katrin Cartlidge)
Evening Standard British Film Awards
Won: Best Actress (Katrin Cartlidge)
Valladolid Film Festival (Spain)
Won: Silver Spike (Mike Leigh; tied with Cosas que dejé en La Habana)
Won: Youth Jury Award – Special Mention Competition (Mike Leigh)
Nominated: Golden Spike (Mike Leigh)

References

External links
 
 
 
 

1997 films
1990s buddy comedy-drama films
1990s female buddy films
British buddy comedy-drama films
British female buddy films
1990s English-language films
Films directed by Mike Leigh
Films set in 1986
Films set in 1996
Films shot in London
1997 comedy films
1997 drama films
1990s British films